Robert Zend (1929 - 1985) was a Hungarian-Canadian poet, fiction writer and a multimedia artist.

Born in Budapest, Zend fled to Canada after the failed Hungarian Uprising of 1956. He took a master's degree in Italian literature from the University of Toronto in 1969, and worked as a producer of Ideas documentaries for CBC Radio.

His poetry collections included From Zero to One (1973), Beyond Labels (1982) and Arbormundi (1982); Oāb, was published in two separate volumes in 1983 and 1985. A short story collection, Daymares: Selected Fictions on Dreams and Time, was published posthumously in 1991.

Zend was part of a trilogy of Toronto poets who published with HMS Press et al. The Three Roberts with Robert Sward and Robert Priest in 1984.

References

External link

Robert Zend, dedications, works, links

1929 births
1985 deaths
Canadian multimedia artists
Artists from Budapest
Artists from Toronto
Writers from Budapest
Writers from Toronto
Canadian male short story writers
Hungarian emigrants to Canada
Canadian radio producers
University of Toronto alumni
Canadian male poets
Hungarian male poets
20th-century Hungarian poets
20th-century Canadian poets
20th-century Canadian male writers
20th-century Canadian short story writers